Albert E. Rees (August 21, 1921 – September 5, 1992) was an American economist and noted author. An influential labor economist, Rees taught at Princeton University from 1966 to 1979, while also being an advisor to President Gerald Ford. He was also a former Provost of Princeton and former president of the Alfred P. Sloan Foundation. He was also the first head of the Council on Wage and Price Stability, a short-lived federal agency.

Discussion 
Born in New York City, Rees earned his bachelor's degree from Oberlin College in 1943. He later received his master's degree and his doctorate in economics from the University of Chicago. After obtaining his Ph.D. in 1950, he went on to chair the economics department at Chicago from 1962 to 1966 before moving to Princeton as economics chair there. He later co-authored a landmark labor study with George P. Shultz. Another notable book, The Economics of Work and Pay, remained in print for two decades over at least six editions at HarperCollins. Notable doctoral students at Princeton included the future Nobel Laureate James Heckman. He won many awards, including a Guggenheim Fellowship in 1969 and election to the American Academy of Arts and Sciences in 1971. Rees died on September 5, 1992, at University Medical Center of Princeton.

Since 1997, Princeton University awards the "Albert Rees Prize" for an outstanding dissertation in labor economics. Oberlin College has also established multiple Albert Rees prizes, including a Fellowship and an Assistantship.

Duke University Libraries has a special collection with his papers. Additional special collections at George Mason University Libraries and the Ford Presidential Library house archives for the Council on Wage and Price Stability, of which he was the founding director.

Council on Wage and Price Stability 

The Council on Wage and Price Stability (COWPS or CWPS) Act was signed into law by President Ford in 1974, with Rees as the new agency's first head. It replaced the formal price controls from the Nixon administration authorized under its precursor, the Economic Stabilization Act of 1970 and its related agency, the Pay Board and Price Commission. The council continued under President Carter (with Alfred E. Kahn replacing Rees as its head under the new administration). When Reagan took office in 1981, CWPS economists moved to the newly formed Office of Information and Regulatory Affairs. Some labor and economic regulator responsibilities merged back into their historic homes with the National Labor Relations Board and the Council of Economic Advisors.

Selected publications

Archives

See also 
 List of Guggenheim Fellowships awarded in 1969
 List of Princeton University people (government)
 List of Princeton University people
 List of University of Chicago faculty
 List of University of Chicago alumni
 List of Oberlin College and Conservatory people

References

External links 

 Albert Rees Collection at Duke University
 Council on Wage and Price Stability Archive at George Mason University

1921 births
1992 deaths
Economists from New York (state)
American academic administrators
Writers from New York City
Oberlin College alumni
University of Chicago alumni
Princeton University faculty
Writers from New Jersey
Writers from Chicago
University of Chicago faculty
Chicago School economists
Alfred P. Sloan Foundation people
United States presidential advisors
Ford administration personnel
American nonprofit chief executives
New Jersey Republicans
American people of Welsh descent
Labor economists
American economics writers
George Mason University people
Heads of United States federal agencies
Fellows of the American Academy of Arts and Sciences
Economists from Illinois
20th-century American economists
Journal of Political Economy editors